Rivera Amplifiers is an American manufacturer of guitar amplifiers. It was founded by Paul Rivera as a research and development firm in August 1976 in Southern California.

Before moving into manufacturing amplifiers under his own name, Paul Rivera ran his own amplifier repair and modification shop, and then worked for Fender Amplifiers. There he acted as Marketing Director, specifying a whole range of amplifiers and designing some himself. These were the last range to be made by Fender before its owners, CBS, sold the company to its then management, and the last to be mass-produced by Fender with 'traditional' (non-PCB) methods. Rivera, like other amplifier builders such as Soldano, began building Fender-based amplifiers to try to capture a piece of the market for hot-rodded multi-channel amplifiers dominated by Mesa Boogie.

References

External links
 Company Website

Instrument amplifiers
Manufacturing companies based in Los Angeles